The discography of American singer Kenny Rogers (1938–2020), consists of 39 studio albums and 80 singles, 21 of which have reached Number One on the country chart. His longest-lasting Number Ones on that chart are "The Gambler" and "Coward of the County", at three weeks each. Two of his Number One country hits, "Lady" and "Islands in the Stream", a duet with Dolly Parton, also reached Number One on the Billboard Hot 100; "Lady" spent six weeks at the top, making it his longest running Number One single on any Billboard chart. More than just a US phenomenon, he found an audience around the world with two of his biggest songs, "Lucille" and "Coward of the County", both reaching Number One on the general sales chart in the UK. His albums The Gambler and Kenny each topped the country chart for at least 20 weeks, while his Greatest Hits was the only album by a solo country performer to top the Billboard 200 during the 1980s, reaching the summit in late 1980.

Studio albums

1970s

1980s

1990s

2000s–2010s

Live albums

Compilations

1970s

1980s

1990s

2000s

2010s

Singles

1950s–1970s

1980s

1990s

2000–2020

Other singles

Charted B-sides

Collaborations

Guest singles

Promotional singles

Music videos

See also
Kenny Rogers and The First Edition, for a discography as a member of Kenny Rogers and The First Edition.

Notes

A ^ "He Will, She Knows" peaked at number 49 on the Canadian RPM Country Tracks chart.

References

Country music discographies
 
 
Discographies of American artists